The Rotax 915 iS is an Austrian aircraft engine, produced by Rotax of Gunskirchen for use in ultralight aircraft, homebuilt aircraft, light-sport aircraft, small helicopters and gyroplanes. The engine was type certified in 2017.

The engine was first publicly displayed at AirVenture in July 2015 and first flown in March 2016.

In January 2016 the engine was named AVweb's "Best New Engine" of 2015.

Design and development
The Rotax 915 iS is a four-cylinder four-stroke, horizontally-opposed, turbocharged, air and liquid-cooled, gasoline engine design, with a mechanical gearbox reduction drive. It employs dual electronically controlled fuel injection, using dual channel Rockwell Collins ECUs, with dual ignition and produces  for take-off and  continuous.

The engine is based on the Rotax 912, but differs in that it has fuel injection, a reinforced crankshaft, new pistons, a new gearbox and a turbocharger. Time between overhauls was expected to eventually be raised to 2000 hours with operational experience, but started at 1200 hours.

The design entered production in the second half of 2017. The European Aviation Safety Agency certified the Rotax 915 iSc3 A on 14 December 2017 and the Rotax 915 iSc3 B on 4 January 2018.

In December 2021 the option to replace the 12V electrical system with a 24V one was introduced. The 24V version of the engine is designated the 915iS C24 for the non-certified version and the 915iSc C24 certified version.

Variants
Rotax 915iS
Base version with a 12V electrical system
Rotax 915iS C24
Non-certified model with 24V electrical system
Rotax 915iSc C24
Certified model with 24V electrical system

Applications 
Issoire APM 41 Simba 915iS
Progressive Aerodyne SeaRey
The Airplane Factory Sling TSi

Specifications (915 iS)

See also

References

External links

Video: Rotax Introduces the 915 iS on AVweb

Rotax engines
2010s aircraft piston engines
Boxer engines